Rammsee is a lake in Schleswig-Holstein, Germany, at an elevation of  with a  surface area.

Lakes of Schleswig-Holstein
LRammsee